Bernhard Winkler (born 24 June 1966) is a German former professional footballer who played as a striker.

Honours
1. FC Kaiserslautern
 Bundesliga: 1990–91
 DFL-Supercup: 1991

References

1966 births
Living people
Association football forwards
German footballers
German football managers
Türkgücü München players
1. FC Schweinfurt 05 players
1. FC Kaiserslautern players
SG Wattenscheid 09 players
SC Fortuna Köln players
TSV 1860 Munich players
Bundesliga players
2. Bundesliga players
Sportspeople from Würzburg
Footballers from Bavaria
West German footballers